Gadens is an Australian law firm which operates in Sydney, Melbourne, Brisbane and Adelaide. The firm also offers services in Perth through Lavan Legal and in Launceston through Rae & Partners. It specialises in corporate and commercial law, property transactions, debt recovery and banking.

History

Gadens' history dates back to 1847. It was the first Australian law firm to establish a multi-disciplinary practice. It has previously had an office in Papua New Guinea.

In 2011, the Brisbane office poached 13 property lawyers from Norton Rose, increasing its size to 30 partners and 270 staff.

In 2013, the Sydney office of Gadens was ordered to pay almost $5 million in damages to Aussie Home Loans founder John Symond for negligent tax advice. Gadens appealed the ruling and got more than $1 million back.

In 2015, Gadens allied with US/China giant Dentons and Singapore firm Rodyk & Davidson to share branding, strategy and information technology. In 2016, Gadens split when its then Sydney and Perth offices joined Dentons.

References

Law firms of Australia